Michel de Gallard (22 April 1922 July 2007) was a French painter.

He is considered a member of the School of Paris and La Ruche and is associated with French artists Bernard Buffet and Bernard Lorjou with whom he founded the Anti-Abstract Art Group "L'homme Témoin".

Awards
 1949 Member of the Salon d'Automne
 1950 Founder Member of the Salon de la Jeune Peinture

References

1921 births
2007 deaths
Modern painters
School of Paris
20th-century French painters
20th-century French male artists
French male painters
21st-century French painters
21st-century French male artists